The National Institute for Seismology, Vulcanology, Meteorology and Hydrology of Guatemala (in Spanish: Instituto Nacional de Sismología, Vulcanología, Meteorología e Hidrología (INSIVUMEH)) is a scientific agency of the Guatemalan government. The agency was created to study and monitor atmospheric, geophysical and hydrological phenomena and events, their hazards to Guatemalan society, and to provide recommendations to the government and the private sector in the occurrence of natural disasters. The agency has four major scientific disciplines, concerning Seismology, Vulcanology, Meteorology and Hydrology.

INSIVUMEH was created in March 1976, shortly after the major 1976 Guatemala earthquake and is part of the Ministry of Communications, Infrastructure and Housing.

References

Government agencies of Guatemala
Seismological observatories, organisations and projects
Volcanology
Governmental meteorological agencies in North America
Hydrology organizations
Research institutes in Guatemala